Nikola Savov (born 8 July 1942) is a Bulgarian boxer. He competed in the men's bantamweight event at the 1968 Summer Olympics.

References

1942 births
Living people
Bulgarian male boxers
Olympic boxers of Bulgaria
Boxers at the 1968 Summer Olympics
Sportspeople from Sliven
Bantamweight boxers